Gomek (1927 – March 6, 1997) was a large saltwater crocodile captured by George Craig in Papua New Guinea. He was purchased by Terri and Arthur Jones in 1985 and was kept in Ocala, Florida, for five years before being sold to the St. Augustine Alligator Farm Zoological Park in Florida. For 8 years he was known for his nutria-tossing abilities and his tolerance of people. Feeders of the beast were allowed to go into the enclosure and get as close as 1 metre from the large animal (a normally suicidal proximity) without any fear of attack. While feeders still used long tongs to feed Gomek, he was generally considered to be a "tame" beast and was a favorite of the St. Augustine Alligator Farm and people around the nation.

After many years, Gomek died of heart disease on March 6, 1997. By then, he was a very old crocodile, and one of the largest and tamest captive crocodiles in existence. There is a tribute to Gomek near his enclosure, which now houses his successors Maximo and his mate Sydney.

References

External links 
St. Augustine Alligator Farm

1997 animal deaths
Individual crocodiles
Ocala, Florida
St. Augustine, Florida